Procypris rabaudi (common name: rock carp) is a species of cyprinid in the genus Procypris. It is considered harmless to humans.

References

Cyprinid fish of Asia
Taxa named by Tchang Tchung-Lin
Fish described in 1930
Freshwater fish of China